Miacora is a genus of moths in the family Cossidae.

Species
 Miacora adolescens (Dyar, 1914)
 Miacora diphyes Forbes, 1942
 Miacora leucocraspedontis Zukowsky, 1954
 Miacora luzena (Barnes, 1905)
 Miacora perplexa (Neumoegen & Dyar, 1893)
 Miacora tropicalis (Schaus, 1904)

Former species
 Miacora roseobrunnea Dognin, 1917

References

Natural History Museum Lepidoptera generic names catalog

Cossinae